Timothy B is the second studio solo album by Timothy B. Schmit, the bass guitarist and co-lead vocalist for the Eagles. The album was released in 1987 on MCA in the United States and Europe, three years after Schmit's debut solo album, Playin' It Cool and seven years after the demise of the Eagles. The album peaked at #106 on the Billboard 200 chart, and the single, "Boys Night Out", hit #25 on the Billboard Hot 100 chart, Schmit's best selling single. The album was produced by Richard Rudolph, and it was co-produced by Bruce Gaitsch.

Background
When Schmit was asked about why there were less notable musicians compared to his last album, he said "I decided to stay out of the real glamour studios and to keep the clientele down too. I did it on purpose mainly for less distractions. I mean I really knew what I wanted to do on this album and I decided purposely not to use my famous and semi-famous friends just to have it be more of what I can do on my own. And that's really the reason."

Critical reception
Reviewing for AllMusic, critic Bruce Eder wrote of the album "The tunes and the songs are good enough, and Schmit is in superb voice, and you have to love the luminous guitar sound in evidence throughout. But it's all a little reminiscent of what happened to the Eagles once they became a top arena act -- all of a sudden, their sound started to get bigger and heavier than their music could carry comfortably."

Track listing

Personnel 
 Timothy B. Schmit – lead vocals, backing vocals (1, 9), bass (2), cymbals (9)
 Bruce Gaitsch – programming, guitars
 Randy Waldman – keyboards (2), acoustic piano (4, 6, 7), trumpet (7), synthesizers (8)
 Robert Irving – keyboards (2)
 Alan Kendall – guitars
 Jonathan Moffett – cymbals (1, 3, 9), percussion (6)
 Jim Horn – baritone saxophone (9)
 Larry Williams – tenor saxophone (9)
 Gary Grant – trumpet (9)
 Jerry Hey – trumpet (9), horn arrangements (9)
 Siedah Garrett – backing vocals (1, 9), chorus backing vocals (7)
 Julia Waters – backing vocals (1, 9)

Production 
 Richard Rudolph – producer, additional engineer 
 Bruce Gaitsch – co-producer, engineer 
 Robert Irving – additional engineer
 Robbie Weaver – additional engineer
 Bud Rizzo – assistant engineer 
 Bill Bottrell – mixing 
 Bob Fudjinski – mix assistant 
 Doug Parry – mix assistant 
 Bernie Grundman – mastering 
 Jeff Adamoff – art direction
 Ron Larson – design 
 Randee St. Nicholas – photography 
 Front Line Management – management

Studios
 Recorded at The Studio (Woodland Hills, CA); Zebra Studio (Studio City, CA); Robert Irving Studios and Bossa Nova Hotel (Los Angeles, CA).
 Mixed at Smoketree Ranch (Chatsworth, CA).
 Mastered at Bernie Grundman Mastering (Hollywood, CA).

Chart performance

Album

Singles

References

1987 albums
Timothy B. Schmit albums
MCA Records albums